The Antarctic Flight was a Royal Australian Air Force (RAAF) aircraft flight. It operated from RAAF Base Laverton and Mawson Station. The flight was responsible for expeditions and rescue missions in Antarctica.

Two ski fitted RAAF Auster AOP.6 (A11-200 &  A11-201) were based at Mawson Station from 1952. On 5 March 1954, A11-200 was lost over the side of a ship. Later the flight included two DHC-2 Beavers and one Dakota aircraft. After 1963, the RAAF planes were withdrawn.

Following this time RAAF aircraft have continued to operate infrequently in support of activities in the Antarctic and sub-Antarctic islands. These have included a number of flights using C-130 Hercules in the 1970s and 1980s into McMurdo Sound and more recently C-17 Globemasters to Wilkins Aerodrome near Casey Station in late 2015 and early 2016.

Notes

References

RAAF independent flights
Aviation in Antarctica
Australia and the Antarctic
Military units and formations established in 1948
Military units and formations disestablished in 1963
1948 establishments in Antarctica
1948 establishments in Australia
1963 disestablishments in Antarctica
1963 disestablishments in Australia